Parvaneh Mafi is an Iranian reformist politician and a member of the Parliament of Iran representing Tehran, Rey, Shemiranat and Eslamshahr electoral district.

Career 
She was formerly governor of Shemiranat County for four years and secretary of management committee at Expediency Discernment Council. She is a women's rights activist and has authored works advocating women's empowerment.

Electoral history

References

1957 births
Living people
People from Kermanshah
Executives of Construction Party politicians
Iranian women's rights activists
Members of the 10th Islamic Consultative Assembly
Members of the Women's fraction of Islamic Consultative Assembly
Association of the Women of the Islamic Republic politicians